Jorge Rojas Justicia (born 15 April 1983 in Santa Coloma de Gramenet, Barcelona, Catalonia) is a Spanish footballer who plays for FE Grama as a central defender.

Rojas played in the Segunda Division with CD Alcoyano.

References

External links

1983 births
Living people
People from Santa Coloma de Gramenet
Sportspeople from the Province of Barcelona
Spanish footballers
Footballers from Catalonia
Association football defenders
Segunda División players
Segunda División B players
Tercera División players
UDA Gramenet footballers
CD Alcoyano footballers
CD Atlético Baleares footballers
UE Olot players
CE Europa footballers